Dunkirk is a village and civil parish between Faversham and Canterbury in southeast England.
It lies on the Canterbury Road between Boughton under Blean and Harbledown. This was the main Roman road from the Kentish ports to London, also known as Watling Street.

Toponymy
The origin of the village's name is still not very clear, but it is understood to come from a house called "Dunkirk", lived in by a Fleming from Dunkirk on the border between France and Belgium.

History
In 1800, according to Edward Hasted, the village was once part of the king's ancient forest of Blean in the 'hundred of Westgate'.

Dunkirk's main claim to fame is that in 1838 it was the scene of the last armed rising on British soil, the Battle of Bossenden Wood to the north of the village. Eleven men died when a band of farm labourers were intercepted by a detachment of soldiers.

In 1940 during World War II, the RAF Chain Home radar station in Dunkirk was bombed several times by the Luftwaffe.

In 2011, the villagers had an official opening of their replacement Village Hall. £230,000 was raised to pay for the new hall.

References

External links

Villages in Kent
Civil parishes in Kent